Chaotic Love Poems is a 2016 Indonesian comedy-drama film directed by Garin Nugroho.

References

External links 
 

2010s Indonesian-language films
2016 films
2016 comedy-drama films
Indonesian comedy-drama films